= Harpalus tianschanicus =

Scientific classification
- Kingdom: Animalia
- Phylum: Arthropoda
- Class: Insecta
- Order: Coleoptera
- Suborder: Adephaga
- Family: Carabidae
- Genus: Harpalus
- Species: H. tianschanicus

Binomial name
- Harpalus tianschanicus Semenov, 1889

Species of beetle

Harpalus tianschanicus is a species of ground beetle in the subfamily Harpalinae. It was described by Semenov in 1889.
